Richard Wesley Woodcock (born January 29, 1928) is an American psychometrician. He is known for his work on the Cattell–Horn–Carroll theory of human intelligence and for his work in the development of several cognitive tests, including the Woodcock–Johnson Tests of Cognitive Abilities and the Dean–Woodcock Neuropsychological Assessment System. He is also credited with introducing the Rasch model into psychometric research. He is a fellow of the American Psychological Association and the American Academy of School Psychology, as well as a Diplomate of the American Board of Professional Psychology. In 1993, he received the Senior Scientist in School Psychology Award from Division 16 of the American Psychological Association. Two research institutes are named after him: the Woodcock Education Center at Western Oregon University, and the Woodcock Institute for Advancement of Neurocognitive Research and Applied Practice at Texas Woman's University, both of which opened in the fall of 2016. As of 2018, he lives in San Diego, California.

References

1928 births
Living people
Scientists from Portland, Oregon
Intelligence researchers
University of Oregon alumni
Western Oregon University faculty
University of Northern Colorado faculty
Vanderbilt University faculty
University of Virginia faculty
Texas Woman's University faculty
Fellows of the American Psychological Association
American cognitive psychologists